Archon Ultra is an action-strategy video game developed by Free Fall Associates and published by Strategic Simulations in 1994 for MS-DOS. It is a remake of the 1983 game Archon: The Light and the Dark which was one of the first releases from Electronic Arts.

Gameplay
A remake of Archon: The Light and the Dark, Archon Ultra adds updated graphics and sound. New gameplay features include secondary weapons that give all units two unique abilities, and the battle sequences are shown from a diagonal overhead point of view to simulate a third dimension in the battles. The game also has a multiplayer mode via modem.

Reception
Computer Gaming World approved of how Ultras new features made the game  "worthwhile to players of the original" without "destroy[ing] the balance of the original", and noted the computer opponent's skill in the middlegame and endgame. The magazine concluded that the developers "brought the graphics and sound of Archon up to current standards, and have made minor changes to game play without sacrificing the elements that made the original a classic". PC Gamer (US) reviewed the game with a 76% Final Verdict citing, "The combination of strategy and arcade sequences give Archon Ultra great replay value." Archon Ultra was reviewed in 1994 in Dragon, receiving only 1 out of 5 stars.

References

External links 

1994 video games
Action video games
DOS games
DOS-only games
Multiplayer null modem games
Strategic Simulations games
Strategy video games
Turn-based strategy video games
Video game remakes
Video games with isometric graphics
Digital tabletop games
Video games developed in the United States